John Menzies plc is a Scottish distribution and aviation business, and former retailer.

John Menzies may also refer to:
 John A. Menzies, judge of the Court of Queen's Bench of Manitoba
 John K. Menzies, former US-Bosnian ambassador and academic
 John W. Menzies (1819–1897), politician, lawyer and judge from Kentucky

Menzies, John